Joshua Benjamin Brenet (born 20 March 1994) is a Dutch professional footballer who plays as a full-back for Eredivisie club Twente.

Club career
Brenet is a graduate of PSV's youth academy, having joined the club in 2011 from Zeeburgia. He made his professional debut on 6 December 2012 in a Europa League game against Napoli, coming on for Peter van Ooijen after 87 minutes.
He made his Champions League qualification debut on 30 July 2013 against Zulte Waregem.

He played on 15 April 2018 as PSV beat rivals Ajax 3–0 to clinch the 2017–18 Eredivisie title.

On 31 January 2022, Brenet joined Twente until the end of the 2021–22 season.

International career
Born in the Netherlands, Brenet is of Curaçaoan descent. Brenet made his debut for the Netherlands in a November 2016 friendly match against Belgium. He was called up to the preliminary squad for the Curaçao national team for the 2021 CONCACAF Gold Cup.

Career statistics

Club

Honours
PSV
Eredivisie: 2014–15, 2015–16
Johan Cruijff Shield: 2015

References

External links
 
 
 Voetbal International profile 
 

1994 births
Living people
Dutch people of Curaçao descent
Sportspeople from Kerkrade
Dutch footballers
Footballers from Limburg (Netherlands)
Association football fullbacks
Netherlands youth international footballers
Netherlands international footballers
Eredivisie players
Eerste Divisie players
Bundesliga players
Regionalliga players
Jong PSV players
PSV Eindhoven players
TSG 1899 Hoffenheim players
TSG 1899 Hoffenheim II players
FC Twente players
Dutch expatriate footballers
Dutch expatriate sportspeople in Germany
Expatriate footballers in Germany